Vasaloppet China is a cross-country skiing competition held in the beginning of every year in Changchun, China. Originally held in 2003, it has been a part of Worldloppet since 2014. The competition is named after Vasaloppet in Sweden.

References 

2003 establishments in China
January sporting events
Recurring sporting events established in 2003
Skiing in China
Ski marathons
Winter sports competitions in China